Domain of the Voord is a Big Finish Productions audio drama based on the long-running British science fiction television series Doctor Who and the first to be realised in the Early Adventures series. The story was written by Andrew Smith and starred William Russell and Carole Ann Ford.

Synopsis

The Doctor, Susan, Ian and Barbara land on the planet Hydra, where Admiral Jonas Kaan leads a vast flotilla of ships trying to elude the vicious race that has invaded and occupied their world. But his ships are being picked off one by one, vessels and crews dragged underwater by an unseen foe.

The time travellers find themselves pitched into battle against the Voord, the ruthless enemy they last encountered on the planet Marinus. As they take the fight to the very heart of the territory now controlled by the Voord the stakes get higher. First they lose the TARDIS... then they lose that which they hold most dear. And that's only the start of their troubles.

In the capital, Predora City, they will learn the truth of what it means to be a Voord. And that truth is horrifying.

Cast

William Russell as Ian Chesterton, The Doctor and Narrator
Carole Ann Ford as Susan Foreman, Barbara Wright and Narrator
Andrew Bone as Pan Vexel and Nebrin
Andrew Dickens as Jonas Kaan and Tarlak
Daisy Ashford as Amyra

Continuity

The Voord first appeared in the 1964 story The Keys of Marinus and went on to appear in Doom Coalition 2: Beachhead with the Eighth Doctor.

References

External links

Domain Of The Voord trailer

Doctor Who: The Early Adventures audio plays
First Doctor stories
2014 audio plays
First Doctor audio plays